Speed limits in Slovakia vary by type of vehicle. The speed limit is 50 km/h in built up areas, 90 km/h on country roads that are not in a settlement, and 130 km/h on motorways. From 2020, all expressways that have a R (Rychlostna cesta) number were considered as a motorway, and expressways (like route 16 or route 64 or route 20) are considered an expressway (only parts of which are a dual carriageway), with a speed limit of 100 km/h, or 80 km/h for trucks. Trucks on motorways, expressways or dual carriageways are not allowed to overtake vehicles except for avoiding obstacles or if switching lanes, to exit, or to get into the right lane at a motorway or expressway intersection. Headlights are also required 24 hours a day for all types of vehicles.

Current speed limits

See also

 Highways in Slovakia

References
2. https://ec.europa.eu/transport/road_safety/going_abroad/slovakia/speed_limits_en.htm

Slovakia
Transport in Slovakia